Little Harbour is a community on the Eastern Shore region of the Halifax Regional Municipality in Nova Scotia, Canada on the Little Harbour Road off Trunk 7, 84 kilometers (51 miles) from Dartmouth.

The area is home to Owls Head Provincial Park.

References
HRM Civic Address Map
Explore HRM

Communities in Halifax, Nova Scotia
General Service Areas in Nova Scotia